The Fly Tour was the first world tour by South Korean boy band Got7. The tour commenced one month before the release of the group's fifth mini album, Flight Log: Departure, and was held between April and August 2016 kicking off in Seoul, and onwards to Osaka, Tokyo, Bangkok, Guangzhou, Singapore, Dallas, Chicago, New York, Atlanta, Los Angeles, Hong Kong, and then finishing in Seoul once again.

Background
On February 26, 2016, Got7 released a comeback schedule for their mini album Flight Log: Departure, with the album and music video set for a March 21 release. They also announced their first concert tour Fly which will be held in Seoul, United States of America, China, Thailand, Singapore, and Japan. Total available seats for confirmed concerts will be 103,985 seats.

Tour dates

Personnel
 Artists
 Mark, JB, Jackson, Jinyoung, Youngjae, BamBam and Yugyeom

 Tour organizer
 JYP Entertainment

 Tour promoter
 4NOLOGUE (Thailand)
 One Production (Singapore) 
 SubKulture Entertainment (USA)

 Ticketing partners
 Interpark (South Korea)
 Thaiticketmajor (Thailand)

References

Got7
2016 concert tours